Subramanyapuram is a small village located near Sathan Kulam, Thoothukudi district, Tamil Nadu. It is about 4 km to the east of Sathan Kulam towards Thattar Madam.

References

Villages in Thoothukudi district